Mihail Ceaur-Aslan  was one of the generals of the Romanian Army in the First World War.

He served as commander of the 3rd Army between 14/27 August - 25 August / 7 September 1916, when his command was lifted due to the defective way in which he led military actions that resulted in the serious defeat at the Battle of Turtucaia.

Early life and family
Mihail Aslan was born in Onești, in the family of the hetman Alecu Ceaur-Aslan, being the eleventh son of the twelve of the hetman and the sixth of his second marriage to Felicia Moser.

He was married to Eliza Olănescu.

Military career
After graduating from the military school of officers with the rank of lieutenant, Mihail Aslan was assigned to the 2nd Hunters Battalion, a unit in which he participated in the military actions of the war of independence from 1877 to 1878. In 1880 he was moved to the 27th Dorobanti Bacau Regiment, and after advancing to the rank of captain, in 1882, he was moved to the School of Sons of Soldiers in Craiova. He also held various positions in Regiments 10 (1883-1885), 3 (1886-1889) and 26 Dorobanti (1890-1893). Between 1893 and 1896 he was commander of the 2nd Hunters Battalion, from where he was moved as director of studies and professor at the Military School of Infantry and Cavalry (1897-1901)

He was commander of: 22nd Dâmbovița Regiment (1901-1903), 27th Bacău Regiment (1903-1907) and 15th Infantry Brigade (1907-1910).

He later worked in the central administration of the Ministry of War as senior director of personnel (1910-1912), senior director of infantry (1912-1913) and technical inspector of the same weapon (1914).

During the Second Balkan War he commanded the 3rd Infantry Division, and in October 1913 he was appointed commander of the 3rd Army Corps.

During the First World War he served as commander of the 3rd Army, and after his dismissal from command, he commanded, from January 1, 1917,  with the 2nd Territorial Corps. On April 30, 1918, he resigned and was transferred to the reserves.

Other works
Regulation of Infantry Exercises, Bucharest, 1906 (translation, 1909)
Memorandum on the fall of the bridgehead Turtucaia, Iași (1918)
Turtucaia. Strategic study, Bucharest, 1921

Awards
Order of the Star of Romania (Knight in 1895 and Officer in 1907)
Order of the Crown
Cross of the Danube Crossing
Russian War Commemorative Medal of 1877-1878

Foreign Awards
 Order of Franz Joseph
: Order of the Sacred Treasure

Bibliography
Falkenhayn, Erich von, The 9th Army Campaign against Romanians and Russians, Atelierele Grafice Socec & Co SA, Bucharest, 1937
Kiritescu, Constantin, History of the war for the unification of Romania, Scientific and Encyclopedic Publishing House, Bucharest, 1989
Ioanițiu Alexandru (Lt.-Colonel), The Romanian War: 1916–1918, vol 1, Genius Printing House, Bucharest, 1929
, Romania in the World War 1916–1919, Documents, Annexes, Volume 1, Official Gazette and State Printing, Bucharest, 1934
, The General Headquarters of the Romanian Army. Documents 1916 - 1920, Machiavelli Publishing House, Bucharest, 1996
, Military History of the Romanian People, vol. V, Military Publishing House, Bucharest, 1989
, Romania during the First World War, Military Publishing House, Bucharest, 1987
, Romania in the First World War, Military Publishing House, 1979

References

1853 births
1928 deaths
People from Onești
Romanian Land Forces generals
Romanian Army World War I generals
Knights of the Order of the Star of Romania
Romanian military personnel of the Second Balkan War
Romanian military personnel of the Russo-Turkish War (1877–1878)